Yangdong Folk Village (Yangdong Village of Gyeongju) is a traditional yangban (Korean Aristocracy) village from the Joseon dynasty. The village is located in Gangdong-myeon, sixteen kilometers northeast of Gyeongju, Gyeongsangbuk-do, South Korea, along the Hyeongsan River. Mt. Seolchang stands to the north of the village. The village is designated as Important Folklore Materials No. 189 by the South Korean government.

The size, degree of preservation, numerous cultural assets, traditionalism, beautiful natural setting all contribute to the importance of Yangdong Village. It is also a fine example of the yangban (Korean aristocracy) lifestyle and Neo-Confucian traditions.

The village is listed by the South Korean government with UNESCO as a World Heritage site with Hahoe Folk Village in 2010.

Overview
The village was founded by Son So (孫昭 1433-1484). The household of the Wolseong Son clan was placed on an auspicious site according to Korean theories of pungsu (geomancy). Son So and his wife, the daughter of Yu Bok Ha had a daughter who married Yi Beon of the Yeogang Yi family.  The marriage produced one of the eighteen sages of Korea, Yi Unjeok.  The village of Yangdong has continued since its auspicious beginning in the 15th century.

Although some of the village is unoccupied today, the overall the village has over 160 tile-roofed and thatched-roof homes built throughout the dense forest.  Fifty-four historic homes over 200 years old have also been preserved.  The village preserves folk customs as well as traditional buildings of traditional Joseon dynasty architecture.  Seobaekodang is the primary home of the Wolseong Son Family.  Mucheomdang, is the primary house of the Yeogang Yi family. Hyangdan is National Treasure No. 412. Ihayangjeon and Simsujeong pavilions, and the Ganghakdang village school are also notable structures of the village as well as Gwangajeong and Sonsoyeongjeong. Tonggamsokpyeon, a book printed on movable metal type and National Treasure No. 283, is also located in the village.
A picture of the village as you enter it. 

Important folk materials at the village include:  
Seobaekdang (No. 23) 
Nakseondang
Sahodang
Sangchunheon
Geunam Manor
Dugok Manor
Sujoldang 
Ihyangjeong
Suunjeong 
Simsujeong
Allakjeong
Ganghakdang

Other cultural properties include:  
Jeokgae Gongsin Nonsang Rokgwan (Tangible Cultural Property No. 13) 
Sonso's Will (Tangible Cultural Property No. 14) 
Pine Tree in Yangdong
Daeseongheon
Son Jong-ro Jeongchungbigak (Cultural Asset Material No. 261) 
Gyeongsan Seodang (Folk Cultural Asset Material) 
Dugok Yeongdang (Folk Cultural Asset Material).

The village follows the topography of the mountains and valleys and is shaped like an auspicious Hanja character.  This arrangement has been carefully preserved.   The homes of the Wolseong Son and Yeogang Yi clans, as well as their descendants' homes are located on the high ground of the mountains and valleys.  The lower-class homes, characterized by their thatched roofs were built on lower ground.  The village's organization highlights the severe social stratification characteristic of Joseon dynasty society. Prince Charles visited Yangdong in 1993.

Gallery

See also 
 Hahoe Folk Village

References

External links 

 Website of Yangdong Village
 UNESCO
 Visit Korea
 World Heritage in Korea (pdf)

Joseon dynasty
Folk villages in South Korea
Gyeongju
Korean culture
World Heritage Sites in South Korea
Tourist attractions in North Gyeongsang Province
Important Folklore Cultural Properties of South Korea